Christ's College Big School is a building of Christ's College in Christchurch, New Zealand. It is registered as a Category I heritage building with Heritage New Zealand.

History

Even before the first settlers came out to Canterbury on the First Four Ships, James FitzGerald had designed what became known as Big School in 1850 back in England as part of the settlement planned by the Canterbury Association. The Canterbury Provincial Council, of which FitzGerald had been the first Superintendent (1853–1857), voted £1,000 for the construction of Big School.  The building was constructed in 1863 and was the school's first stone building.  It is the only building known to have been designed by FitzGerald.

The building was remodelled in 1970 by Miles Warren, an old boy of the school. It is the oldest building in the school complex. It is the oldest educational building in New Zealand in continuous use.  Until 1989, the building was still largely in its original condition, when it was extended towards the west by five gabled wings.  Sir Miles was the architect again and he won awards for the extension. The view from the school's quadrangle remained the same. The building is used by the school as a library.

Heritage registration
The building was registered as a heritage building by the New Zealand Historic Places Trust on 7 April 1983 with registration number 48 classified as A. With the change of the classification system, the building later became a Category I listing.

Architecture
The design of the building is relatively simple. Prior to the 1989 extension, the plan was a rectangle. From the quadrangle, the viewer sees solid buttresses, rows of lancet windows and a steeply pitched roof. The roof pitch allowed for the heavy snow falls that the Canterbury Association wrongly expected in Canterbury. The pattern in the roof tiles is believed to have been added in 1896. While in use as a school, the interior was gloomy, according to a 21st-century source, as the windows were whitewashed.

See also
 List of historic places in Christchurch

References

Heritage New Zealand Category 1 historic places in Canterbury, New Zealand
1863 in New Zealand
Libraries in Christchurch
Schools in Christchurch
1860s architecture in New Zealand